The 2021 Go Bowling 250 was the 25th stock car race of the 2021 NASCAR Xfinity Series season, and the 40th iteration of the event. The race was held on Saturday, September 11, 2021 in Richmond, Virginia at Richmond Raceway, a  D-shaped oval. The race took 250 laps to complete. For the second straight race, Noah Gragson of JR Motorsports would be able to hold off the field on a late race restart to win the race. To fill out the podium, Justin Haley of Kaulig Racing and John Hunter Nemechek of Sam Hunt Racing would finish 2nd and 3rd, respectively.

Dale Earnhardt Jr. would return to racing as a one-off for the NASCAR Xfinity Series.

Background 

Richmond Raceway (RR), formerly known as Richmond International Raceway (RIR), is a 3/4-mile (1.2 km), D-shaped, asphalt race track located just outside Richmond, Virginia in Henrico County. It hosts the NASCAR Cup Series, the NASCAR Xfinity Series, NASCAR Camping World Truck Series and the IndyCar series. Known as "America's premier short track", it formerly hosted two USAC sprint car races.

Entry list 

*Driver would change to Ty Dillon due to Moffitt not feeling well.

**Driver changed to Bayley Currey.

Starting lineup 
Qualifying was determined by a qualifying metric system based on the previous race, the 2021 Sport Clips Haircuts VFW 200. As a result, Austin Cindric of Team Penske would win the pole.

Race results 
Stage 1 Laps: 75

Stage 2 Laps: 75

Stage 3 Laps: 100

References 

2021 NASCAR Xfinity Series
NASCAR races at Richmond Raceway
Go Bowling 250
Go Bowling 250